Sparda may refer to:

 Sparda, the Old Persian name for Lydia
 Sparda (Devil May Cry), a video game character
 Sparda-Bank, a group of German and Austrian cooperative banks